John D. Ceretto (born May 12, 1952) is an American politician and a former Democratic member of the New York State Assembly, representing the 145th Assembly District from 2011 to 2016. His district included the cities of Niagara Falls and Tonawanda also, the towns of Lewiston, Cambria, Niagara, Wheatfield, and Grand Island.

Education and early career
A Niagara Falls native, he attended La Salle Senior High School and is a graduate of Niagara University with a Bachelors and a master's degree in Education and Administration. While still in college, he worked for the Carborundum Abrasive Company. Upon completing his education, he worked as a substitute teacher in many of the local schools and then worked for 20 years at the Tulip Corporation in Niagara Falls.

Political career
In 1995, Ceretto was elected as a councilman on the Lewiston Town Board as a member of the Democratic Party. In 2005, he was elected Niagara County Legislator in the 12th District. Ceretto also served as Vice-Chairman of the Niagara County Economic Development Committee and Chairman of the Niagara County Refuse Department. In 2006, Ceretto changed his party affiliation, joining the Republican Party.

In the November 2010 election for State Assembly, Ceretto beat former Assemblywoman Francine DelMonte, who ran on the Working Families Party Line facing and Democratic challenger candidate and former Niagara Falls City Councilman John Accardo.

On August 18, 2015, Ceretto announced that he would run for reelection in 2016 as a Democrat. He was defeated that year by Republican Angelo Morinello.

Personal life
Ceretto married his wife Beth in 1978. They reside in Lewiston, New York, with their four children. The middle child John D. Ceretto II is an assistant district attorney for Niagara County.

See also
List of people from Lewiston, New York

References 

1952 births
Living people
Members of the New York State Assembly
New York (state) Republicans
Niagara University alumni
Politicians from Niagara Falls, New York
People from Lewiston, New York
New York (state) Democrats
21st-century American politicians